Russia are an international speedway team who compete in the major international competition, the Speedway World Cup. They are managed by Andrey Savin and the current captain is Rybnik's Denis Gizatullin.

Due to the 2022 Russian invasion of Ukraine, on March 6, 2022, the Fédération Internationale de Motocyclisme banned all Russian motorcycle riders, teams, officials, and competitions.

2009 Squad 

 Denis Gizatullin
 Grigory Laguta
 Renat Gafurov
 Roman Povazhny
 Denis Saifutdinov
 Daniil Ivanov
 Roman Ivanov
 Sergey Darkin

Juniors:
 Emil Sayfutdinov
 Artem Laguta
 Andrey Kudryashov
 Sergiej Sygryszew

Speedway World Cup 
The Russia national speedway team has never won the Speedway World Cup.

The following table shows their best recent performance in 1996 when the tournament was run with pairs rather than teams.

Team U-21 World Championship

Notable Soviet Union and Russian Riders 
 Igor Plechanov
 Valery Gordeev
 Vladimir Gordeev
 Vladimir Paznikov
 Viktor Trofimov
 Rinat Mardanshin
 Oleg Kurguskin
 Emil Sayfutdinov

See also 
 Sport in Russia
 motorcycle speedway

References 

National speedway teams
Speedway